Anna Kalinskaya and Viktória Kužmová were the defending champions, but chose not to participate.

Liang En-shuo and Xun Fangying won the title, defeating Hiroko Kuwata and Sabina Sharipova in the final, 6–4, 6–1.

Seeds

Draw

Draw

References

External links
Main Draw

Pingshan Open - Doubles
2019 Women's Doubles